Whisky (Scottish English; otherwise whiskey) is an alcoholic beverage.

Whisky or whiskey may refer to:

Art, entertainment, and media

Music
 Way Down Yonder (re-released in 1997 as Whiskey), an album by Charlie Daniels

Songs
 "Whiskey" (Jana Kramer song), 2012
 "Whiskey" (Maroon 5 song), 2017
 "Whiskey", by Inspiral Carpets from Dung 4 (1989)
 "Whiskey", by Loggins and Messina's from Loggins and Messina (1972)
 "Whiskey", by New Riders of the Purple Sage from Gypsy Cowboy (1972)

Other media
 Whisky (film), a 2004 Argentine-German-Spanish-Uruguayan film
 Whiskey (play), a 1973 one-act play by Terrence McNally
 Whiskey, a character from the TV series Dollhouse
 Whiskey, a character from Kingsman: The Golden Circle

Other uses
 One-horse shay or whisk(e)y, a light, covered, two-wheeled carriage for two persons
 Whisky, the letter W in the NATO phonetic alphabet
 Whisky a Go Go or The Whisky, a nightclub in West Hollywood, California, U.S.
 Whiskey-class submarine, a class of Soviet naval submarines

See also
 Whiskey Creek (disambiguation)
 Whiskey Gap, Alberta, a ghost town in southern Alberta, Canada
 Whisky Party